Curumaní is a town and municipality in the Colombian Department of Cesar.

References

External links
 Curumani official website

Municipalities of Cesar Department